Villers-Saint-Sépulcre is a railway station located in the commune of Villers-Saint-Sépulcre in the Oise department, France.  The station is served by TER Hauts-de-France trains from Creil to Beauvais.

References

Railway stations in Oise